Eric B. Grosfils (born March 22, 1966) is an American physical volcanologist and planetary geologist. He is the Minnie B. Cairns Memorial Professor of Geology at Pomona College in Claremont, California.

Personal life 
Grosfils is married to Linda A. Reinen, a structural geologist who is also on the Pomona faculty.

References

External links
Faculty page at Pomona College

1966 births
Living people
Pomona College faculty
21st-century American geologists
Astrogeologists
American volcanologists